Probe NCG 8436 is a 1981 role-playing game adventure for Space Opera published by Fantasy Games Unlimited.

Contents
Probe NCG 8436 is an adventure that concerns a survey mission to an uncharted system some 57 light-years from the Martigan system in the Procyon subsector.

Reception
William A. Barton reviewed Probe NCG 8436 in The Space Gamer No. 48. Barton commented that "Overall [...] Probe NCG 8436 has enough potential to provide some intriguing adventure sessions for Space Opera play. While not as exciting an adventure as the recent Alien Base, it is far superior to the earlier Martigan Belt."

References

Role-playing game supplements introduced in 1981
Space Opera adventures